Ayet Ali Khan was a Bengali classical musician.

Early life
Khan was born in Shibpur, Brahmanbaria, Bengal Presidency, British Raj in 1884. He trained under his brothers Fakir Aftabuddin Khan and Ustad Alauddin Khan. He trained in Rampur under Ustad Wazir Khan for 30 years.

Career
Khan took residence in the Mihir State as court musician. He formed an indigenous instrumental orchestra with his brother. In 1935 he joined Santiniketan as the head of the Music department after Rabindranath Tagore invited him. he left the post over health reasons. He invented two musical instruments, Manohara and Mandrand and developed the surbahar and the sarod. He invented a number of Ragas including Aol-Basanta, Omar-Sohag, Varis, and Hemantika. He established the Alauddin Music College in 1948 in Comilla and in 1954 in Brahmanbaria. From 1961 to 1965 he worked at Radio Pakistan. He was awarded Tamgha-i-Imtiaz in 1961 and in 1966 the Pride of Performance Award.

Death and legacy
Khan died in 1967. He was posthumously awarded the Bangladesh Shilpakala Academy Award in 1976 and the Independence Day Award in 1984.

References

Bengali musicians
1884 births
1967 deaths
Musicians in British India